In Your Distant Vicinity (In Traditional Chinese: 在你遙遠的附近; In Simplified Chinese: 在你遥远的附近) is a personal album created by Alex Fong Lik-Sun in 2007.

List of songs

References
Sina Music

2007 albums
Alex Fong (singer) albums